Bow Church is a Docklands Light Railway (DLR) station in Bow, London, England. It is between Devons Road and Pudding Mill Lane stations. It is interlinked by an out of station interchange (OSI) within  walking distance via Bow Road with Bow Road station on London Underground's District and Hammersmith and City lines. The two Bow stations are classed as a single station for ticketing purposes as well as on tube maps but both managed separately. Opened with the original system on 31 August 1987, the station takes its name from the nearby 14th century Bow Church, which is a Church of England church.

There is a crossover south of the station which allows trains from Stratford and Poplar to reverse here. One example of this is when the new platforms at Stratford were being constructed – trains were suspended between Bow Church and Stratford and trains from Poplar terminated here. The station is accessible via lifts to both platforms and it has ticket machines and Oyster pads.

Connections
Five London Buses routes serve this station: 25, 108, 205, 425, N205. Additionally 25 and 108 have a 24-hour service. Also routes 8, 276, 488 and the D prefix route D8 (towards Poplar only) serve the station indirectly by Bow Church.

References

External links

 Docklands Light Railway website – Bow Church station page

Docklands Light Railway stations in the London Borough of Tower Hamlets
Railway stations in Great Britain opened in 1987
Bow, London